The Dante Society of America is an American academic society devoted to the study of Dante Alighieri. the oldest scholarly societies in North America, the DSA predates both the Modern Language Association, founded in 1883, and the American Historical Association, founded in 1884. After the Deutsche Dante-Gesellschaft (founded in 1865) it is the second-oldest scholarly organization devoted to the study of this medieval Italian poet. The Dante Society of America is also one of the first scholarly societies in the United States to welcome women among its founding members. The current president is Alison Cornish of New York University.

Early history
The society was formally established in 1881 by Henry Wadsworth Longfellow, James Russell Lowell, and Charles Eliot Norton, who were its first three presidents. Without the impetus of Longfellow, both as a translator and as an educator, the Dante Society of America might never have come into being.  Scholar Karl Witte had initiated and sustained an early Deutsche Dante-Gesellschaft in Germany for a dozen years before it ceased its activities in 1877. One year earlier, a similar group had come together in Oxford, with scholar Edward Moore at its helm, but it was Longfellow, with his translation of the Italian epic poem, who first brought the Americans James Russell Lowell and Charles Eliot Norton to his table at Craigie House to discuss Dante.

While Longfellow was designated the first president of the Society, the actual inauguration did not take place until May 16, 1882, two months after Longfellow's death. There, the forty-eight members mourned the loss of Longfellow, while electing Lowell to continue the leadership of the Society.

Founded in Cambridge, Mass., the society has always been closely associated with Harvard University, due in no small part to the lasting influence of these three professors. Harvard was one of the first American universities to make instruction in modern languages (in addition to classical languages) part of its curriculum. Edward Everett Hale, an early member of the Society, remembered his Italian lessons and Longfellow's lectures at Harvard:

Longfellow read the whole of Dante with us and we were well prepared for this by what we had read with [Pietro] Bachi ... And I can say that when we came to hear Longfellow lecture, we were more than prepared for his lectures by the very thorough work which Bachi had done in this same subject with us.

James Russell Lowell took over Longfellow's course upon his resignation in 1855. Twenty-two years later, he would resign his chair at Harvard to accept the appointment of United States Minister to Spain and pass the course on to a professor in the history of art, Charles Eliot Norton. Norton's classes were described by another early member of the Society, William Roscoe Thayer:

To read Dante with Norton was almost an act of worship. There was in his voice something wonderfully stirring and wholly incommunicable. As he reached a favorite passage his face became radiant and his tones more tender. He explained fully from every side,-- verbal, textual, literary, spiritual ... In his interpretation of Dante Norton had one immense advantage which neither Lowell nor any other English-speaking Dantist has possessed: he had a specialist's knowledge of mediaeval art. So the thirteenth century lived for him not merely in its poetry, theology, and chronicles, but in paintings and statues in its churches and town halls, and its palaces and dwellings ... he could compass the whole circle of experience and the ideals of that world of which the Divine Comedy is the supreme expression in language.

Another early goal of the Society was to create a specialized library of Dante literature. Few works by Italian scholars on Dante were available in the United States. The three volume commentary on the Comedy by G. Biagioli first published in Paris in 1816 and later reissued by Neapolitan publisher Rondinella in 1868, could be found on the shelves of the Harvard College Library. So too the 1887 edition of Pietro Fraticelli's commentary, originally published in 1860 by G. Barbera of Florence. These might have been supplemented by Cesare Balbo's Vita di Dante, or some of Foscolo's essays, but it was under the direction of William Coolidge Lane, an assistant librarian at the Harvard College Library and member of the Society, that an extensive scholarly collection began to take shape.  Charles Eliot Norton's bequest would both broaden and deepen the collection. An 1890 catalog of the collection compiled by Lane and issued by the Harvard Library listed over 1200 volumes on Dante, including over three hundred different editions of the Divine Comedy. Today the collection at Harvard is regarded as the third largest on the subject in the world.

Early women members 
From its founding, membership in the Dante Society of America was open to women. This was unusual for the time, as membership in other early scholarly societies in North America such as the American Philosophical Society and the Modern Language Association were not generally open to women. The first annual report of the Society listed Miss S.L. Butler, Mrs. C. Dupee, Miss Heloise Durant, Mrs. S. A. Gordon, Miss Fannie L. Payson, and Mrs. A.L. Wister as founding members. In 1902, Yale Ph.D. and Smith professor Mary Augusta Scott would become the first woman to serve on the Executive Council. Scott was followed by Margaret Jackson in 1907, Anna Lyman Mason Gray in 1913 and Katherine V. Spencer in 1915. Other early female members of note include Anna Eliot Ticknor, Isabella Stewart Gardner, and Caroline Healey Dall.

Publications
During the 19th and 20th centuries, the Society  published an important series of concordances: E.A. Fay, Concordance of the Divine Comedy (1888); E.S. Sheldon and A.C. White, Concordanza delle opere italiane in prosa e del canzoniere di D. (1905); E.K. Rand, E.H. Wilkins, and A.C. White, D. Alagherii operum latinorum concordantiae (1912); E.H. Wilkins and T.G. Bergin, Concordance to the D. C. (1965).

Today the Society produces the peer-reviewed journal, Dante Studies, under the editorship of Justin Steinberg,  published by Johns Hopkins University Press. The journal is abstracted and indexed in a number of databases. The society also publishes The Electronic Bulletin of the Dante Society of America under the editorship of Simone Marchesi of Princeton University.

References

External links 

 The Electronic Bulletin of the Dante Society of America

Literary societies
Learned societies of the United States
Dante Alighieri
Arts organizations established in 1881
1881 establishments in the United States
Harvard University